HNLMS Koningin Regentes was a  (pantserschip) of the Royal Netherlands Navy. The ship was built at the Rijkswerf in Amsterdam at the start of the twentieth century.  After the eruption of the Mount Pelée volcano on the French island of Martinique the ship provided assistance to the casualties, and then later participated in an expedition to the island of Bali in 1906. She made several journeys to show the Dutch flag and was finally decommissioned in 1920.

Design
Two  single turret guns provided the ship's main armament, and these were augmented by four single  guns and eight  single guns. The ship had a complement of 340 men.

Service history
After being laid down in 1898, Koningen Regentes was built at the Rijkswerf in Amsterdam and launched on 24 April 1900. The ship was christened there by the Dutch Queen Mother, Emma of Waldeck and Pyrmont and was then commissioned into the Royal Netherlands Navy on 3 January 1902.

On 11 March that year she departed from the port of Vlissingen bound for the Dutch West Indies in response to rising political tension between the Netherlands and Venezuela to evacuate the Jews of Coro to Curaçao. She interrupted this journey to assist and help the casualties of the Mount Pelée volcano eruption on the French island of Martinique. Prior to their arrival, the Venezuelan Navy had repeatedly checked Dutch and Antillean merchant ships and the presence of the Dutch warships acted as a deterrent against further actions.

In 1906 Koningin Regentes, along with her sister ship  and the protected cruiser , assisted in an expedition to the island of Bali in the Dutch East Indies as part of Dutch attempts to integrate the southern kingdoms of Tabanan, Badung and Klungkung into the Dutch East Indies. On 16 and 17 September, the ships bombarded the city of Denpasar and afterwards ground forces broke what resistance remained.

The following year the ship undertook a cruise to Australia to show the flag.

On 4 April 1918, during the final stages of World War I, the ship and the  escorted the passenger ships Vondel, Kawi, Rindjani and Grotius to the port of Tanjung Priok. The ships were intercepted in the eastern parts of the Indian archipelago by the two warships after Dutch merchant ships had been confiscated by British and American naval forces, exercising the Angary right.

The ship was finally decommissioned in 1920.

References

Coastal defence ships of the Royal Netherlands Navy
1900 ships
Ships built in Amsterdam